Antoinette Scieri (1890-1968) was a French nurse convicted of murdering her elderly patients.

Scieri was born in Italy and studied nursing at Doullens during World War I. 
She was arrested and imprisoned for fraud and theft in 1915 for stealing valuables and posing as injured men to receive funds.

After her release in 1916, she moved to Saint-Gilles in 1920 with her violent and abusive partner and began work as a private nurse. 
Deaths began in 1924 and continued through 1926. On April 27, 1926, she was convicted of poisoning twelve people with the herbicide pyralion. 
She confessed and was sentenced to death. Her sentence was commuted to life and she died in 1968 after being released from prison in 1960.

See also 
List of serial killers in France
List of medical and pseudo-medical serial killers

References 

1890 births
20th-century criminals
French female murderers
French female serial killers
Medical serial killers
People convicted of murder by France
Poisoners
Serial killers who died in prison custody
Italian emigrants to France